Dangerous Obsession is a psychological thriller written by N. J. Crisp which premièred at the Churchill Theatre, Bromley on 9 November 1987.

A film, very loosely based on Crisp's play, was filmed in 1999 as Darkness Falls, starring Ray Winstone, Tim Dutton and Sherilyn Fenn. N. J. Crisp's name does not appear on the titles.

Thriller plays
Plays by N. J. Crisp
British plays adapted into films
1987 plays